"Single Perfect Raindrop" is a song written by Greg Arnold and recorded by Australian folk-rock band Things of Stone and Wood. The song was released in June 1993 as the fourth and final single from the band's debut studio album The Yearning. "Single Perfect Raindrop" peaked at number 50 on the ARIA Charts.

Track listing

Charts

References

1992 songs
1993 singles
Things of Stone and Wood songs
Songs written by Greg Arnold